In mathematics, particularly linear algebra and functional analysis, a spectral theorem is a result about when a linear operator or matrix can be diagonalized (that is, represented as a diagonal matrix in some basis). This is extremely useful because computations involving a diagonalizable matrix can often be reduced to much simpler computations involving the corresponding diagonal matrix. The concept of diagonalization is relatively straightforward for operators on finite-dimensional vector spaces but requires some modification for operators on infinite-dimensional spaces. In general, the spectral theorem identifies a class of linear operators that can be modeled by multiplication operators, which are as simple as one can hope to find. In more abstract language, the spectral theorem is a statement about commutative C*-algebras. See also spectral theory for a historical perspective.

Examples of operators to which the spectral theorem applies are self-adjoint operators or more generally normal operators on Hilbert spaces.

The spectral theorem also provides a canonical decomposition, called the spectral decomposition, of the underlying vector space on which the operator acts.

Augustin-Louis Cauchy proved the spectral theorem for symmetric matrices, i.e., that every real, symmetric matrix is diagonalizable. In addition, Cauchy was the first to be systematic about determinants. The spectral theorem as generalized by John von Neumann is today perhaps the most important result of operator theory.

This article mainly focuses on the simplest kind of spectral theorem, that for a self-adjoint operator on a Hilbert space. However, as noted above, the spectral theorem also holds for normal operators on a Hilbert space.

Finite-dimensional case

Hermitian maps and Hermitian matrices 
We consider a Hermitian map  on a finite-dimensional complex inner product space  endowed with a positive definite sesquilinear inner product . The Hermitian condition on  means that for all ,

In the case that  is identified with a Hermitian matrix, the matrix of  can be identified with its conjugate transpose.

This condition implies that all eigenvalues of a Hermitian map are real: it is enough to apply it to the case when  is an eigenvector. (Recall that an eigenvector of a linear map  is a (non-zero) vector  such that  for some scalar . The value  is the corresponding eigenvalue. Moreover, the eigenvalues are roots of the characteristic polynomial.)

Theorem. Each eigenvalue is real.

We provide a sketch of a proof for the case where the underlying field of scalars is the complex numbers.

Then since 
  
we find that  is real. Applying the same argument to  shows that  has an eigenvector . Finite induction then finishes the proof.

The spectral theorem holds also for symmetric maps on finite-dimensional real inner product spaces, but the existence of an eigenvector does not follow immediately from the  fundamental theorem of algebra. To prove this, consider  as a Hermitian matrix and use the fact that all eigenvalues of a Hermitian matrix are real.

Let

 

be the eigenspace corresponding to an eigenvalue . Note that the definition does not depend on any choice of specific eigenvectors.  is the orthogonal direct sum of the spaces  where the index ranges over eigenvalues. 

 

 

The spectral decomposition is a special case of both the Schur decomposition and the singular value decomposition.

Normal matrices 

The spectral theorem extends to a more general class of matrices. Let  be an operator on a finite-dimensional inner product space.  is said to be normal  if . One can show that  is normal if and only if it is unitarily diagonalizable.
If  is normal, then one sees that . Therefore,  must be diagonal since a normal upper triangular matrix is diagonal (see normal matrix). The converse is obvious.

In other words,  is normal if and only if there exists a unitary matrix  such that

 

where  is a diagonal matrix. Unlike the Hermitian case, the entries of  need not be real.

Compact self-adjoint operators 

In the more general setting of Hilbert spaces, which may have an infinite dimension, the statement of the spectral theorem for compact self-adjoint operators is virtually the same as in the finite-dimensional case.

Theorem. Suppose  is a compact self-adjoint operator on a (real or complex) Hilbert space . Each eigenvalue is real.

As for Hermitian matrices, the key point is to prove the existence of at least one nonzero eigenvector. One cannot rely on determinants to show existence of eigenvalues, but one can use a maximization argument analogous to the variational characterization of eigenvalues. 

If the compactness assumption is removed, then it is not true that every self-adjoint operator has eigenvectors.

Bounded self-adjoint operators

Possible absence of eigenvectors

The next generalization we consider is that of bounded self-adjoint operators on a Hilbert space.

Namely the distribution , where  is the Dirac delta function, is an eigenvector when construed in an appropriate sense. The Dirac delta function is however not a function in the classical sense and does not lie in the Hilbert space  or any other Banach space. Thus, the delta-functions are "generalized eigenvectors" of  but not eigenvectors in the usual sense.

Spectral subspaces and projection-valued measures

In the absence of (true) eigenvectors, one can look for subspaces consisting of almost eigenvectors. In the above example, for example, where  we might consider the subspace of functions supported on a small interval  inside . In this approach to the spectral theorem, if  is a bounded self-adjoint operator, then one looks for large families of such "spectral subspaces". Each subspace, in turn, is encoded by the associated projection operator, and the collection of all the subspaces is then represented by a projection-valued measure. 

One formulation of the spectral theorem expresses the operator  as an integral of the coordinate function over the operator's spectrum  with respect to a projection-valued measure.

 

When the self-adjoint operator in question is compact, this version of the spectral theorem reduces to something similar to the finite-dimensional spectral theorem above, except that the operator is expressed as a finite or countably infinite linear combination of projections, that is, the measure consists only of atoms.

Multiplication operator version

An alternative formulation of the spectral theorem says that every bounded self-adjoint operator is unitarily equivalent to a multiplication operator. The significance of this result is that multiplication operators are in many ways easy to understand.

The spectral theorem is the beginning of the vast research area of functional analysis called operator theory; see also the spectral measure.

There is also an analogous spectral theorem for bounded normal operators on Hilbert spaces.  The only difference in the conclusion is that now  may be complex-valued.

Direct integrals
There is also a formulation of the spectral theorem in terms of direct integrals. It is similar to the multiplication-operator formulation, but more canonical.

The elements of this space are functions (or "sections")  such that  for all . 
The direct-integral version of the spectral theorem may be expressed as follows:

Note, however, that unless the one-element set  has positive measure, the space  is not actually a subspace of the direct integral.

Although both the multiplication-operator and direct integral formulations of the spectral theorem express a self-adjoint operator as unitarily equivalent to a multiplication operator, the direct integral approach is more canonical. First, the set over which the direct integral takes place (the spectrum of the operator) is canonical. Second, the function we are multiplying by is canonical in the direct-integral approach: Simply the function .

Cyclic vectors and simple spectrum
A vector  is called a cyclic vector for  if the vectors  span a dense subspace of the Hilbert space. Suppose  is a bounded self-adjoint operator for which a cyclic vector exists. In that case, there is no distinction between the direct-integral and multiplication-operator formulations of the spectral theorem. This result represents  simultaneously as a multiplication operator and as a direct integral, since  is just a direct integral in which each Hilbert space  is just .

Not every bounded self-adjoint operator admits a cyclic vector; indeed, by the uniqueness in the direct integral decomposition, this can occur only when all the 's have dimension one. When this happens, we say that  has "simple spectrum" in the sense of spectral multiplicity theory. That is, a bounded self-adjoint operator that admits a cyclic vector should be thought of as the infinite-dimensional generalization of a self-adjoint matrix with distinct eigenvalues (i.e., each eigenvalue has multiplicity one).

Although not every  admits a cyclic vector,  it is easy to see that we can decompose the Hilbert space as a direct sum of invariant subspaces on which  has a cyclic vector. This observation is the key to the proofs of the multiplication-operator and direct-integral forms of the spectral theorem.

Functional calculus
One important application of the spectral theorem (in whatever form) is the idea of defining a functional calculus. The interesting cases are where  is a nonpolynomial function such as a square root or an exponential. Either of the versions of the spectral theorem provides such a functional calculus. In the direct-integral version, for example,  acts as the "multiplication by " operator in the direct integral:
.

General self-adjoint operators 
Many important linear operators which occur in analysis, such as differential operators, are unbounded. There is also a spectral theorem for self-adjoint operators that applies in these cases.  To give an example, every constant-coefficient differential operator is unitarily equivalent to a multiplication operator. Indeed, the unitary operator that implements this equivalence is the Fourier transform; the multiplication operator is a type of Fourier multiplier.

In general, spectral theorem for self-adjoint operators may take several equivalent forms. Notably, all of the formulations given in the previous section for bounded self-adjoint operators—the projection-valued measure version, the multiplication-operator version, and the direct-integral version—continue to hold for unbounded self-adjoint operators, with small technical modifications to deal with domain issues.

See also 
 
 Spectral theory of compact operators
 Spectral theory of normal C*-algebras
 Borel functional calculus
 Spectral theory
 Matrix decomposition
 Canonical form
 Jordan decomposition, of which the spectral decomposition is a special case.
 Singular value decomposition, a generalisation of spectral theorem to arbitrary matrices.
 Eigendecomposition of a matrix
 Wiener–Khinchin theorem

Notes

References

 Sheldon Axler, Linear Algebra Done Right, Springer Verlag, 1997
 
 Paul Halmos, "What Does the Spectral Theorem Say?", American Mathematical Monthly, volume 70, number 3 (1963), pages 241–247 Other link
 M. Reed and B. Simon, Methods of Mathematical Physics, vols I–IV, Academic Press 1972.
 G. Teschl, Mathematical Methods in Quantum Mechanics with Applications to Schrödinger Operators, https://www.mat.univie.ac.at/~gerald/ftp/book-schroe/, American Mathematical Society, 2009.
 

Linear algebra
Matrix theory
Singular value decomposition
Theorems in functional analysis
Theorems in linear algebra